The canton of Saint-Gaudens is an administrative division of the Haute-Garonne department, southern France. Its borders were modified at the French canton reorganisation which came into effect in March 2015. Its seat is in Saint-Gaudens.

It consists of the following communes:
 
Aspret-Sarrat
Ausson
Balesta
Blajan
Bordes-de-Rivière
Boudrac
Boulogne-sur-Gesse
Cardeilhac
Castéra-Vignoles
Cazaril-Tambourès
Charlas
Ciadoux
Clarac
Cuguron
Le Cuing
Escanecrabe
Estancarbon
Franquevielle
Gensac-de-Boulogne
Labarthe-Inard
Labarthe-Rivière
Lalouret-Laffiteau
Landorthe
Larcan
Larroque
Lécussan
Lespiteau
Lespugue
Lieoux
Lodes
Loudet
Miramont-de-Comminges
Mondilhan
Montgaillard-sur-Save
Montmaurin
Montréjeau
Nénigan
Nizan-Gesse
Péguilhan
Pointis-Inard
Ponlat-Taillebourg
Régades
Rieucazé
Saint-Ferréol-de-Comminges
Saint-Gaudens
Saint-Ignan
Saint-Lary-Boujean
Saint-Loup-en-Comminges
Saint-Marcet
Saint-Pé-Delbosc
Saint-Plancard
Saman
Sarrecave
Sarremezan
Saux-et-Pomarède
Savarthès
Sédeilhac
Les Tourreilles
Valentine
Villeneuve-de-Rivière
Villeneuve-Lécussan

References

Cantons of Haute-Garonne